"Only One Woman" is a song and the first single by English musical duo the Marbles, written by Barry, Robin and Maurice Gibb of the Bee Gees. It later also appeared on their self-titled album The Marbles.

Recording and reception
It was recorded around July 1968 in IBC Studios, London. The backing track was created by Barry Gibb, Maurice Gibb and Colin Petersen, with an orchestral arrangement by Bill Shepherd. Colin plays the same percussion effect as on "I've Gotta Get a Message to You". The song exists only in a mono mix.

The song was the biggest hit they had in their short-lived career. It entered the UK chart at number 24 and eventually peaked at number five on 2 November 1968. In the Netherlands, it reached number three.

Their performance in a French TV of the song was televised on 192TV.

Personnel
Graham Bonnet – lead vocal
Trevor Gordon – backing vocal
Barry Gibb – guitar
Maurice Gibb – bass, piano
Colin Petersen – drums
Bill Shepherd – orchestral arrangement

Chart performance

Weekly charts

Year-end charts

Cover versions
The Bee Gees recorded their own version for inclusion on their album Main Course. It featured lead vocals by Barry but was finally not released.
Nigel Olsson, recently released from Elton John's band as their drummer, released his second self-titled studio album. This album included a cover of "Only One Woman", which was also released as a single.
Alcatrazz with Graham Bonnet himself, re-recorded the song on their third album, Dangerous Games, released in 1986.
Alien, a Swedish rock band with Jim Jidhed as lead vocalist, reached number one in Sweden with their cover version. It was also covered by Declan Galbraith on his "Thank You" album and by German actor and singer Uwe Ochsenknecht (simply billed as "Ochsenknecht") in 1992.
Czech singer Lucie Bílá covered the song as "Zpíváš mi Requiem", which became a moderately successful hit in the Czech Republic in that year.

See also
List of number-one singles in 1969 (New Zealand)

References

1968 songs
1968 debut singles
The Marbles (duo) songs
Nigel Olsson songs
Number-one singles in New Zealand
Number-one singles in South Africa
Polydor Records singles
Song recordings produced by Barry Gibb
Song recordings produced by Maurice Gibb
Song recordings produced by Robert Stigwood
Songs written by Barry Gibb
Songs written by Maurice Gibb
Songs written by Robin Gibb